Hymns and Spiritual Songs is the 14th studio album released by Bradley Joseph on the Robbins Island Music label.

Track listing
"We Gather Together" – 4:55
"O Holy Night" – 5:39
"Amazing Grace" –  4:22
"Ave Maria (Schubert) – 6:02  
"All Things Bright & Beautiful"  – 2:28
"Holy, Holy, Holy, Lord God Almighty"  – 3:28  
"O Come, O Come, Emmanuel" – 2:36  
"Sweet Hour of Prayer"  – 4:16
"Praise to the Lord, the Almighty" – 3:08   
"How Great Thou Art" – 4:02  
"Great is Thy Faithfulness"  – 3:42
"Rock of Ages"  – 3:47  
"A Mighty Fortress is our God"  – 3:30
"Joyful, Joyful (Ode to Joy)"  – 2:50

Personnel
All music arranged and performed by Bradley Joseph.
Portrait photography: J. Dunn
Art and Design: Tony Horning

References

External links
Official Website
[ Hymns and Spiritual Songs] at Allmusic
Hymns and Spiritual Songs at Discogs

2007 albums
Bradley Joseph albums
Christian music albums by American artists